Richard Daniel Roman (born 16 March 1965 in Kings Cross, London) is a British songwriter and record producer best known for his work with pop musicians.

Biography
Roman was born in 1965 to Spanish parents. In 1992 he moved to Spain where he established himself as a major Latin pop songwriter and producer, working with some of the biggest names in entertainment.

Roman worked with Paulina Rubio (Vive El Verano), Xuxa, Rebeca, Lorena Rojas, Shaila Durcal, Cristian Castro, Jerry Rivera and others.

Selected discography
Paulina Rubio - Paulina (Universal Latino)
Rebeca - Rebelde (Max Music)
Xuxa - El Mundo Es De Los Dos (Universal Latino)

Sources
[ AMG Music Guide]
ASCAP
RIAA

References

1965 births
Living people
Musicians from London
English record producers
English songwriters
People from St John's Wood
Latin American music
English people of Spanish descent
People from Marbella
English composers
English lyricists